Vera Vsevolodovna Baranovskaya (1885 – 7 December 1935) was a Russian Empire and Soviet actress. She performed in more than twenty films between 1916 and 1935.

Biography
Baranovskaya was born in 1885 Saint Petersburg. She studied acting at the Moscow Art Theatre, where her teacher was Konstantin Stanislavsky. She became member of the Moscow Art Theater troupe in 1903. In 1915 she began to perform independently in theaters of Kharkiv, Odessa, Tiflis, Kazan, and other cities.

Baranovskaia’s screen debut was in The Thief-Benefactor (1916), an Anton Chekhov adaptation.

In the year 1922 she founded the artistic-theatrical workshop ("Mastbar") in Moscow.
In the 1920s she worked in Germany and Czechoslovakia.

In 1926, Vsevolod Pudovkin cast her as Nilovna, the heroine of his 
revolutionary tragedy Mother, an adaptation of Maksim Gorky’s 1906 novel. Baranovskaia, who was 40 at the time of shooting, portrayed a much older woman who is devoted to her son and ultimately accepts the inevitability of class struggle. Pudovkin also cast Baranovskaia as the harsh worker’s wife who undergoes a transformation in The End of St. Petersburg (1927). One of her last roles in Soviet cinema was in Abram Room’s social drama Pits (1928).
In 1928 Baranovskaia left the USSR for Czechoslovakia, Germany, and later France, where she continued acting. Sometimes she played parts of proletarians, as in Mikhail Dubson’s Poison Gas (1929) and Carl Jung-hans’s Such Is Life (1929). Her last part, was of a duchess in Max Neufeld’s adaptation of a Viennese operetta, Eternal Waltz (1935).

She died in 1935 in Paris.

Selected filmography

References

External links

1885 births
1935 deaths
Actresses from Saint Petersburg
Actresses from the Russian Empire
Soviet silent film actresses
20th-century Russian actresses
Soviet emigrants to France
Soviet expatriates in Czechoslovakia
Soviet expatriates in Germany